Tonawanda (formally the Town of Tonawanda) is a town in Erie County, New York, United States. As of the 2020 census, the town had a population of 72,636. The town is at the north border of the county and is the northern inner ring suburb of Buffalo. It is sometimes referred to, along with its constituent village of Kenmore, as "Ken-Ton". The town was established in 1836, and up to 1903 it included what is now the city of Tonawanda.

History 
This area was under French control from the 17th century until it was ceded to the British after the French and Indian War.

The first European settlers arrived around 1805. Rapid growth began after the construction of the Erie Canal, completed in 1825. Tonawanda occupies the northwest corner of Erie County and is bounded on the north by the Erie Canal, which here follows Tonawanda Creek.

The town of Tonawanda was established in 1836, by separation from the town of Buffalo (now part of the city of Buffalo). At that time it included land that later became part of the town of Grand Island (established 1852) and the entire city of Tonawanda (established 1904).

In 1899, Kenmore incorporated as a village of the town, and remained the town's primary residential and commercial district until the rest of the town was heavily developed into suburban housing in the 1940s and 1950s.

Geography

The northern border of the town is the city of Tonawanda and Tonawanda Creek, which is part of the Erie Canal, and the western border is the Niagara River. Ellicott Creek flows parallel to Tonawanda Creek in the northern part of the town, with a confluence just east of the Niagara River. The eastern border, marked by U.S. Route 62 (Niagara Falls Boulevard), is the town of Amherst. Forming the southern border is the village of Kenmore and the city of Buffalo.

Adjacent cities and towns
 Fort Erie, Ontario - southwest
 City of Buffalo - south
 Town of Amherst - east
 City of North Tonawanda, Niagara County - north
 City of Tonawanda - north
 Town of Grand Island - northwest

Major highways

   Interstate 190 (Niagara Section) passes through the western part of town from the Buffalo city line to the South Grand Island Bridges onto Grand Island north to Niagara Falls, NY, and Niagara Falls, Ontario.
  Interstate 290 (Youngmann Expressway) travels through the town from I-190 to US 62 and beyond to Amherst.
  U.S. Route 62, north-south highway that marks the east town line as Niagara Falls Boulevard.
  New York State Route 265 (Military Road), north-south highway through western part of town from the Buffalo city line to the city of Tonawanda line.
  New York State Route 266 (River Road), north-south roadway paralleling the Niagara River in the town from the Buffalo city line to the city of Tonawanda line.
  New York State Route 324 (Sheridan Drive, Grand Island Boulevard), east-west highway through the town from Niagara Falls Boulevard (US 62) to River Road (NY 266) where it crosses the South Grand Island Bridge onto Grand Island.
  New York State Route 325 (Sheridan Drive), north-south road from Sheridan Drive/Grand Island Boulevard (NY 324) to River Road (NY 266). It is the only part of Sheridan Drive not signed as NY 324 and continues as Sheridan westward from where it NY 324 becomes Grand Island Boulevard.
  New York State Route 384 (Delaware Avenue), north-south highway in the town from the Kenmore village line to the city of Tonawanda line.
  New York State Route 425 (Twin Cities Memorial Highway), north-south highway in the northern part of town beginning at the I-290 and Colvin Boulevard interchange that heads north into the city of Tonawanda by way of the Twin Cities Memorial Highway.

Demographics

As of the census of 2010, there were 78,155 people, 33,278 households, and 21,164 families residing in the town. The population density was 4,156.3 people per square mile (1,605.1/km2).  There were 34,634 housing units at an average density of 1,841.8 per square mile (711.3/km2).  The racial makeup of the town was 93.01% White, 1.41% Black or African American, 0.30% Native American, 0.40% Asian, 1.30% Pacific Islander, 0.36% from other races, and 1.60% from two or more races. Hispanic or Latino of any race were 2.70% of the population.

There were 32,951 households, out of which 22.8% had children under the age of 18 living with them, 43.1% were married couples living together, 11.6% had a female householder with no husband present, and 41.4% were non-families.

Environmental issues
In 2009, citizen environmental monitoring of air quality problems resulted in an investigation by the United States Environmental Protection Agency (EPA) into emissions from Tonawanda Coke Corporation (TCC), a producer of foundry coke located on River Road, Tonawanda. In 1998 TCC had been cited by the EPA for violations of oil spill prevention sections of the federal Clean Water Act following contamination of the nearby Niagara River. The investigations into air quality revealed TCC was using an unreported pressure-relief system to vent coke oven gases containing benzene direct to the atmosphere, operating a coke-quenching tower without pollution-control baffles, and dumping hazardous waste in the form of coal tar sludge.

In March 2013 TCC was convicted by a federal jury on 11 counts of violating the Clean Air Act (CAA) and three counts of violating the Resource Conservation and Recovery Act (RCRA). In March 2014 TCC was sentenced in federal court to pay a $12.5 million penalty and $12.2 million in community service payments for the violations. TCC's Environmental Control Manager, Mark L. Kamholz, was convicted of 11 counts of violating the CAA, one count of obstruction of justice and three counts of violating the RCRA, and was sentenced to one year in prison, 100 hours of community service, and a $20,000 fine.

In July 2014 DuPont was fined $440,000 for violations of the CAA at its plant at Sheridan Drive and River Road. The EPA found that the plant had inadequate pollution-control equipment, failed to maintain a monitoring system for the equipment, violated several reporting requirements and underreported air pollution on its annual statements. Emissions from the plant included methyl methacrylate and vinyl fluoride.

Culture

Landmarks
One of the Town of Tonawanda's best known landmarks is the blue Korean War-era Grumman F9F-6P Cougar Naval airframe displayed in Walter M. Kenney Field at the northwest corner of Brighton Road and Colvin Boulevard. The "blue jet," as it is often called, has been on loan to the town from the U.S. government since May 1959. Immediately behind the F9F-6P airframe is the Town of Tonawanda Veterans Memorial, dedicated on August 18, 2009. Retired U.S. Army General and former U.S. Secretary of State Colin L. Powell delivered the keynote address during the memorial's dedication ceremony before a crowd of more than 1,500.

The Town of Tonawanda Historical Society operates a museum out of a former German Evangelical Church constructed in 1849. This facility, located at 100 Knoche Road, is the oldest public building in the town.

Notable people

 Tom Askey, former NHL goaltender
 Wolf Blitzer, journalist and author, graduated from Kenmore West High School
 Marc A. Coppola, former New York state senator

 William Conrad III, member of the New York State Assembly

 Herbert O. Fisher, chief test pilot for Curtiss-Wright
 Edward Gibson, former astronaut, Skylab 4
 Robert J. H. Kiphuth, former Yale University swimming coach
 Ben Kish, former NFL safety
 Helene Macaulay, celebrity make-up artist
 Joe McCarthy, former Yankees and Hall of Fame manager
 Joe Mesi, former professional boxer
 Van Miller, retired sports announcer
 Henry J. Overbeck, Wisconsin state assemblyman
 Fletcher Pratt, writer
 Tam Rose, former head coach of Tonawanda Kardex Lumbermen
 Bill Scherrer, former MLB pitcher, current assistant GM for Chicago White Sox

Education
Tonawanda has two public high schools: Kenmore West Senior High School and Kenmore East High School.

The town is also home to St. Joseph's Collegiate Institute, Mount Saint Mary Academy, and Cardinal O'Hara High School.

Communities and locations 
 Brighton – neighborhood by the east town line.
 Brighton Park – park and golf course in the northeast part of the town.
 Ellicott Creek Park –  park operated by the Erie County Department of Parks, Recreation and Forestry.
 Green Acres – neighborhood in the northeast corner of the town.
 Kenilworth – neighborhood in the southeast corner of the town.
 Kenmore – village completely within the borders of the town.
 Lincoln Park – park in the southeast corner of the town.
 Old Town – neighborhood on the western edge of the town, between the industrial area and Niagara River.
 Parkview – neighborhood in the northeast corner of the town, bordering Ellicott Creek Park.
 Sheridan Park – park and golf course in the western part of the town.
 Sheridan Parkside – neighborhood on the western part of the town, just east of Sheridan Park.
 Tonawanda – census-designated place within the town.

See also
 Tonawanda (disambiguation)

References

External links

  Town of Tonawanda official website
 
 Early Tonawanda history

Buffalo–Niagara Falls metropolitan area
Towns in Erie County, New York